Flattening is a measure of the compression of a circle or sphere along a diameter to form an ellipse or an ellipsoid of revolution (spheroid) respectively. Other terms used are ellipticity, or oblateness.

Definitions 
There are three variants of flattening; when it is necessary to avoid confusion, the main flattening is called the first flattening. and online web texts

In the following,  is the larger dimension (e.g. semimajor axis), whereas  is the smaller (semiminor axis).  All flattenings are zero for a circle.
{| class="wikitable" style="border:1px solid darkgray;" cellpadding="5"
! style="padding-left: 0.5em" scope="row" | (First) flattening 
| style="padding-left: 0.5em" |  
| style="padding-left: 0.5em" | 
| style="padding-left: 0.5em " | Fundamental. Geodetic reference ellipsoids are specified by giving 
|-
! style="padding-left: 0.5em" scope="row" | Second flattening
| style="padding-left: 0.5em" |  
| style="padding-left: 0.5em" | 
| style="padding-left: 0.5em" | Rarely used.
|-
! style="padding-left: 0.5em" scope="row" | Third  flattening 
| style="padding-left: 0.5em" | 
| style="padding-left: 0.5em" |  
| style="padding-left: 0.5em" | Used in geodetic calculations as a small expansion parameter.   
|}

Identities
The flattenings can be related to each-other:

The flattenings are related to other parameters of the ellipse. For example,

where  is the eccentricity.

See also 
 Earth flattening
 
 Equatorial bulge
 Ovality
 Planetary flattening
 Sphericity
 Roundness (object)

References

Celestial mechanics
Geodesy
Trigonometry
Circles